Cerro Mercedario is the highest peak of the Cordillera de la Ramada range and the eighth-highest mountain of the Andes. It is located 100 km to the north of Aconcagua, in the Argentine province of San Juan. It was first ascended in 1934 by Adam Karpiński and Wiktor Ostrowski, members of a Polish andinist expedition led by Konstanty Jodko-Narkiewicz. The Polish party erected a cairn on the summit.

In 1968, after several attempts by some of the strongest Argentine climbers, a Japanese group led by Saburo Yoshida accomplished the first ascension of the south side. In 1971 an Austrian expedition led by Fritz Moravec and Othmar Kucera, climbed the north side. In 1972, Italians Sergio Job Gino and Antonio Beorchia Nigris climbed the Mercedario through the normal route and discovered some Inca ruins just below the summit. In January 1975 an Italian expedition led by Antonio Mastellaro managed to climb the east side.
In 1983 a small expedition from Gorizia was able to traverse the south-west ridge, which is considered the most difficult trail of the mountain, and one of the last mountaineering issues in the Andes. On January 27 Mauro Collini, Sergio Figel, Mario Tavagnutti and Rudi Vittori reached the top.

Photo gallery

See also
 List of Ultras of South America
 List of peaks by prominence

References

External links
 Mercedario on SummitPost

Mountains of Argentina
Volcanoes of Argentina
Subduction volcanoes
Landforms of San Juan Province, Argentina
Six-thousanders of the Andes